Ockert Douglas (born 27 July 1966) is a South African cricketer. He played in two first-class matches for Boland in 1989/90.

See also
 List of Boland representative cricketers

References

External links
 

1966 births
Living people
South African cricketers
Boland cricketers
Cricketers from Paarl